Desmoglein-3 is a protein that in humans is encoded by the DSG3 gene. In the skin epidermis Desmoglein-3 is expressed in the basal lower layers of the epidermis, and dominates in terms of expression on mucosal surfaces compared to Desmoglein-1.

Function 

Desmosomes are cell-cell junctions between epithelial, myocardial, and certain other cell types. Desmoglein 3 is a calcium-binding transmembrane glycoprotein component of desmosomes in vertebrate epithelial cells. Currently, four desmoglein subfamily members have been identified and all are members of the cadherin cell adhesion molecule superfamily. These desmoglein gene family members are located in a cluster on chromosome 18. This protein, along with Desmoglein-1, has been identified as the autoantigen of the autoimmune skin blistering disease pemphigus vulgaris. The mucosal dominant form  of pemphigus vulgaris only involves antibodies against Desmoglein-3 and causes mucosal erosions, but no skin lesions. Desmoglein-3 serves as a prognostic marker of Esophageal Squamous Cell Carcinoma (ESCC), and may even be involved in the progression of ESCC.

Pathogenicity 
Pathogenicity of Desmoglein-3 antibodies comes from the existence of a tryptophan residue that could be interacting with the binding pocket that is necessary for trans-interaction of Desmoglein molecules. Such antibodies can lead to the cause of skin disorders like pemphigus vulgaris.

Interactions 

Desmoglein 3 has been shown to interact with PKP3.

See also 
 Desmoglein
 List of target antigens in pemphigus
 List of conditions caused by problems with junctional proteins

References

Further reading